= The Alexander School =

Private college in Richardson, Texas, USA

Coordinates: 32°57′18.8″N 96°42′33.1″W

The Alexander School was a private college preparation middle and high school (grades 7–12) in Richardson, Texas. Named after Alexander the Great, it was established by David B. Bowlin in 1975. It closed permanently on June 1, 2017.
